Chamberlain is an unincorporated community in White Oak Township, Hubbard County, Minnesota, United States, near Akeley and Hackensack.

The community is along State Highway 64 (MN 64) near Hubbard County Road 119 and 170th Street. It is seven miles south of Akeley.

References

Unincorporated communities in Hubbard County, Minnesota
Unincorporated communities in Minnesota